The 2017 Four Nations Tournament was the 16th edition of the Four Nations Tournament, an invitational women's football tournament held in China.

Participants

Venues

Match officials
The following referees were chosen for the 2017 Four Nations Tournament.
Referees
  Guan Xing
  Li Minglu
  Mi Siyu
  Yu Hong

Assistant referees
  Bao Mengxiao
  Cui Yongmei
  Fang Yan
  Song Xiangyun

Standings

Match results

References 

2017 in women's association football
2017
2017 in Chinese football
January 2017 sports events in Asia
2017 in Chinese women's sport